The Zhanghewan Pumped Storage Power Station is a pumped-storage hydroelectric power station located  southwest of Shijiazhuang in Jingxing County of Hebei Province, China. Construction on the power station began on 6 December 2003 and the first unit was commissioned on 1 February 2009. The power station operates by shifting water between an upper and lower reservoir to generate electricity. The lower reservoir is created by the Zhanghewan Dam  on the Gantao River which was built between 1977 and 1980, originally for irrigation. For this project the Zhanhewan Dam was raised . The Zhanghewan Upper Reservoir is on Laoyemiao Mountain, above the west side of the lower reservoir. During periods of low energy demand, such as at night, water is pumped from Zhanghewan Lower Reservoir up to the upper reservoir. When energy demand is high, the water is released back down to the lower reservoir but the pump turbines that pumped the water up now reverse mode and serve as generators to produce electricity. The process is repeated as necessary and the plant serves as a peaking power plant.

See also

List of pumped-storage power stations

References

Dams in China
Pumped-storage hydroelectric power stations in China
2009 establishments in China
Energy infrastructure completed in 2009
Dams completed in 2009
Rock-filled dams
Hydroelectric power stations in Hebei
Gravity dams
Buildings and structures in Shijiazhuang
Underground power stations